Gol Darreh-ye Olya may refer to:
 Gol Darreh-ye Olya, Kermanshah